Galesville is a city in Trempealeau County, Wisconsin, United States. The population was 1,662 at the 2020 census. It is located where Beaver Creek flows into a wide area of the Mississippi River valley. The creek is impounded to form Lake Marinuka. The mayor is Vince Howe.

History
Galesville is named for its founder, Judge George Gale, a native of Vermont. It was platted by Gale in 1854.  It was formally incorporated as a village in 1887, and then as a city in 1942.

Geography

Demographics

2020 census
As of the census of 2020, the population was 1,662. The racial makeup of the city was 91.9% White, 1.9% Asian, 0.4% Black or African American, 0.1% Native American, 1.4% from other races, and 4.4% from two or more races. Ethnically, the population was 2.2% Hispanic or Latino of any race.

2010 census
As of the census of 2010, there were 1,481 people, 635 households, and 388 families living in the city. The racial makeup of the city was 96.6% White, 0.1% African American, 0.2% Native American, 1.0% Asian, 0.4% from other races, and 1.6% from two or more races. Hispanic or Latino of any race were 1.2% of the population.

There were 635 households, of which 30.1% had children under the age of 18 living with them, 46.3% were married couples living together, 9.6% had a female householder with no husband present, 5.2% had a male householder with no wife present, and 38.9% were non-families. 33.7% of all households were made up of individuals, and 16.1% had someone living alone who was 65 years of age or older. The average household size was 2.25 and the average family size was 2.87.

The median age in the city was 41.6 years. 22.7% of residents were under the age of 18; 6.7% were between the ages of 18 and 24; 24.7% were from 25 to 44; 27.9% were from 45 to 64; and 18.1% were 65 years of age or older. The gender makeup of the city was 47.9% male and 52.1% female.

2000 census
As of the census of 2000, there were 1,427 people, 606 households, and 355 families living in the city. The population density was 1,316.8 people per square mile (510.2/km2). There were 648 housing units at an average density of 597.9 per square mile (231.7/km2). The racial makeup of the city was 99.09% White, 0.14% African American, 0.07% Native American, 0.14% Asian, 0.07% Pacific Islander, 0.07% from other races, and 0.42% from two or more races. Hispanic or Latino of any race were 0.42% of the population.

There were 606 households, out of which 29.2% had children under the age of 18 living with them, 45.7% were married couples living together, 10.4% had a female householder with no husband present, and 41.3% were non-families. 36.1% of all households were made up of individuals, and 18.2% had someone living alone who was 65 years of age or older. The average household size was 2.26 and the average family size was 2.97.

In the city, the population was spread out, with 24.5% under the age of 18, 8.2% from 18 to 24, 25.5% from 25 to 44, 22.3% from 45 to 64, and 19.5% who were 65 years of age or older. The median age was 40 years. For every 100 females, there were 87.3 males. For every 100 females age 18 and over, there were 81.0 males.

The median income for a household in the city was $35,054, and the median income for a family was $45,333. Males had a median income of $29,453 versus $22,137 for females. The per capita income for the city was $18,245. About 6.0% of families and 9.6% of the population were below the poverty line, including 11.9% of those under age 18 and 14.3% of those age 65 or over.

Education
The Gale-Ettrick-Trempealeau School District, also known as G-E-T, is a rural, public school district that serves the communities of Galesville and nearby Ettrick and Trempealeau.

The school district, based in Galesville, has three elementary schools (one in each town), one middle school in Galesville, and one high school (Gale-Ettrick-Trempealeau High School) in Galesville. The Red Hawk athletic teams compete in the Coulee Conference.

Notable people
 Alexander Ahab Arnold, Speaker of the Wisconsin State Assembly
 Sam Brenegan, baseball player
 Eugene Clark, Wisconsin State Senator
 George Gale, jurist, legislator, and founder of Galesville and Trempealeau County 
 Charles N. Herreid, Governor of South Dakota
 Suzanne Jeskewitz, Wisconsin State Representative
 Frank A. Kellman, Wisconsin State Representative
 Norris J. Kellman, Wisconsin State Representative
 Elmer Petersen, sculptor of public art around La Crosse and creator of the World's Largest Buffalo
 Nicholas Ray, American film director (born Raymond Nicholas Kienzle)
 Albert Twesme, Wisconsin State Representative and jurist
 Guilford M. Wiley, Wisconsin State Representative

Images

References

External links

 City of Galesville
 Galesville Chamber of Commerce
 Sanborn fire insurance maps: 1894 1900 1910

Cities in Wisconsin
Cities in Trempealeau County, Wisconsin
1854 establishments in Wisconsin